Puzur-Ashur I was an Assyrian king in the 21st and 20th centuries BC. He is generally regarded as the founder of Assyria as an independent city-state,  2025 BC. 

He is in the Assyrian King List and is referenced in the inscriptions of later kings (his son and successor Shalim-ahum and the later Ashur-rim-nisheshu and Shalmaneser III.) These later kings mentioned him among the kings who had renewed the city walls of Assur begun by Kikkia.

Puzur-Ashur I may have started a native Assyrian dynasty that endured for eight generations until Erishum II was overthrown by the Amorite Shamshi-Adad I. Hildegard Lewy, writing in the Cambridge Ancient History, rejects this interpretation and sees Puzur-Aššur I as part of a longer dynasty started by one of his predecessors, Sulili. Inscriptions link Puzur-Aššur I to his immediate successors,  who, according to the Assyrian King List, are related to the following kings down to Erišum II.

Puzur-Ashur I's successors bore the title Išši’ak Aššur, vice regent of Assur, as well as ensí.

See also

 Timeline of the Assyrian Empire
 Early Period of Assyria
 List of Assyrian kings
 Assyrian continuity
 Assyria

References

21st-century BC Assyrian kings
20th-century BC Assyrian kings